Walter Gorini (born 29 August 1944) is a retired Italian track cyclist who was active between 1966 and 1967. He won one bronze and one gold medals in the tandem at the world championships of 1966 and 1968, respectively (both with Giordano Turrini); he finished fourth in this event at the 1968 Summer Olympics (with Luigi Borghetti).

References

1944 births
Living people
Olympic cyclists of Italy
Cyclists at the 1968 Summer Olympics
Italian male cyclists
Sportspeople from the Province of Ravenna
Cyclists from Emilia-Romagna